Alem Koljić (born 16 February 1999) is a German and Bosnian-Herzegovinian footballer who plays as a defender for TuS Rot-Weiß Koblenz.

References

External links
 Profile at DFB.de
 Profile at FuPa.net

1999 births
Living people
People from Westerwaldkreis
Footballers from Rhineland-Palatinate
German footballers
Bosnia and Herzegovina footballers
German people of Bosnia and Herzegovina descent
Germany youth international footballers
Association football defenders
TuS Koblenz players
Bayer 04 Leverkusen players
FC Schalke 04 players
MSV Duisburg players
SC Fortuna Köln players
SC Hessen Dreieich players
FC Rot-Weiß Koblenz players
3. Liga players